A total solar eclipse will occur on July 16, 2186, which will be the longest total eclipse for thousands of years. The eclipse will pass over the southern Galápagos Islands (with a total eclipse of 4 minutes occurring over the southern tip of Española Island), the northern tip of Ecuador (with a total eclipse of 3 minutes and 26 seconds on Isla Santa Rosa), central Colombia (4 minutes and 50 seconds over Bogota), central Venezuela, and northern Guyana (7 minutes and 4 seconds just north of Anna Regina).

Extreme duration 

This will be the longest total solar eclipse between the dates of 4000 BC and at least AD 6000 (10,000 years), lasting a maximum of 7 minutes, 29.22 seconds. The factors that will make this such a long eclipse are:
 The Earth being very near aphelion (furthest away from the Sun in its elliptical orbit, making its angular diameter nearly as small as possible). This occurs around July 6th.
 The Moon being almost exactly at perigee (making its angular diameter as large as possible). The moment of greatest eclipse will be just 50 minutes after perigee.
 The midpoint of the eclipse being very close to the Earth's equator, where the Earth's rotational velocity is greatest. 
 The midpoint of the eclipse being near the subsolar point (the part of the Earth closest to the Sun, and therefore also closest to the Moon during an eclipse).
 The vector of the eclipse path at the midpoint of the eclipse aligning with the vector of the Earth's rotation (i.e. not diagonal but due east). For solar eclipses at the ascending node (odd numbered saros) this occurs approximately 12 days after the summer solstice.

The longest historical total eclipse lasted 7 minutes 27.54 seconds on June 15, 743 BC. 
The longest eclipse theoretically possible for the 3rd millennium is 7 minutes and 32 seconds.

Related eclipses

Saros 139

References

External links
 NASA Solar eclipses: 2101 to 2200
 Besselian Elements
 NASA googlemap of eclipse path

2186 July 16
2186 July 16
22nd century in science
2180s